Christopher Woojin Yoo (born December 19, 2006) is an American chess grandmaster.  He became the youngest International Master in American history in February 2019 until surpassed by Abhimanyu Mishra later in 2019.

Chess career
In March/April 2018, Yoo earned clear first place in the Charlotte Chess Center's Spring 2018 IM Norm Invitational held in Charlotte, North Carolina with a score of 6.0/9.
Yoo also won the 2020 US Cadet (under-16) Championship.

In May 2021, Yoo tied for first place with GM Peter Prohaszka in the Memorial Day 2021 CCCSA GM Norm Invitational tournament with a performance rating of 2600, earning his first GM norm. 

In September 2021, Yoo won the Labor Day 2021 CCCSA GM Norm Invitational tournament with a performance rating of 2620, earning his second GM norm. 

In November 2021, Yoo tied for 3rd place at the 2021 US Masters with a performance rating of 2604, earning his third GM norm.

On December 12, 2021, Yoo achieved a live FIDE rating of 2500.2 after round 5 of the Marshall Chess Club Championship, fulfilling the last requirement for the Grandmaster title.

In December 2021, Yoo tied for 1st place at the 2021 Charlotte Open alongside Grandmasters Titas Stremavičius, Cemil Can Ali Marandi, Tanguy Ringoir, Robby Kevlishvili, and Akshat Chandra with a performance rating of 2603, earning a fourth GM norm.

In July 2022, Yoo won the US Junior Chess Championship with 7/9, a point ahead of the field. 

In October 2022, Yoo defeated GM Wesley So with the black pieces in the second round of the US Chess Championship in an over 200 point upset.

In November 2022, Yoo tied for 1st place at the 2022 US Masters with a performance rating of 2653, and claimed the 2022 US Masters title after winning a blitz playoff against GM Alejandro Ramirez by a score of 2-0.

References

Living people
2006 births
American chess players
Chess grandmasters
Sportspeople from California